Ulrik Lennart Brock (born 16 January 1945, in Copenhagen) is a sailor from Denmark. Brock represented his country at the 1972 Summer Olympics in Kiel. Brock took 7th place in the Danish Flying Dutchman with Hans Fogh as helmsman.

References

Living people
1945 births
Sportspeople from Copenhagen
Danish male sailors (sport)
Sailors at the 1972 Summer Olympics – Flying Dutchman
Olympic sailors of Denmark